Santa Cruz is a canton in the Guanacaste province of Costa Rica. The head city is in Santa Cruz district.

History 
Santa Cruz was created on 7 December 1848 by decree 167.

On September 5, 2012, Santa Cruz was struck by a magnitude 7.6 earthquake, destroying houses in the canton.

Geography 
Santa Cruz has an area of  km² and a mean elevation of  metres.

The heart-shaped canton is on the northern Pacific coast between Potrero Bay to the north and the mouth of the Montaña River to the south. It includes Velas Cape, the furthermost western point on the Nicoya Peninsula. The Tempisque River delineates a small portion of the eastern border.

Districts 
The canton of Santa Cruz is subdivided into the following districts:
 Santa Cruz
 Bolsón
 Veintisiete de Abril
 Tempate
 Cartagena
 Cuajiniquil
 Diriá
 Cabo Velas
 Tamarindo

Demographics 

For the 2011 census, Santa Cruz had a population of  inhabitants.

Transportation

Road transportation 
The canton is covered by the following road routes:

Festivals
The capital city of Santa Cruz, named Santa Cruz, is a typical Costa Rican rural town. Its inhabitants are very diverse and consist mostly of farmers, fishermen, workers or employees of several of the many hotels located in the vicinity. The town is known within Costa Rica for its cultural heritage and many historical traditions. These traditions include the Fiesta de Semana Santa (Easter week celebration) and the traditional bullfights as well as many others.

Every year in Santa Cruz there are a number of festivals which include bull riding ceremonies. These ceremonies, though traditional at heart, lack most of the features seen in Spanish bullfighting traditions. Usually the ring in which the bull is let loose is open to anyone, tourists as well as locals – man, woman or child. The bull riding usually starts with a man being placed on the bull with nothing but a string to hold on to. This man is inevitably, after some time, thrown off. Even though there are always medical personnel in place to supervise the bull riding, severe injuries or even death among the bullriders are not uncommon.

The bulls are treated with respect and dignity and in no bullring within Costa Rica is it ever alright to deliberately injure or kill a bull in a bullfight, whereas in Spain or Mexico the very purpose of the bullfight is for a trained professional to kill the bull.

The canton also includes the town of Santa Bárbara, known for its traditional annual dance of the calabashes (baile de los guacales). Since 2000 the activity has been considered of cultural interest to the community and all participants receive a hand-painted calabash vessel to thank them for their economic contribution (which they paid in the form of an entrance ticket).

References

External links
 "Santa Cruz Canton Map" Instituto de Fomento y Asesoría Municipal, 1984

Cantons of Guanacaste Province
Populated places in Guanacaste Province